William Walter Jones (July 1, 1902 – death unknown), nicknamed "Wee Willie", was an American Negro league catcher from 1922 to 1930.

A native of Daytona Beach, Florida, Jones made his Negro leagues debut in 1922 with the Bacharach Giants. He played eight seasons with the Giants, and played in every game of the 1926 and 1927 Colored World Series for the club. Jones finished his professional career in 1930 with the Hilldale Club.

References

External links
 and Baseball-Reference Black Baseball stats and Seamheads

1902 births
Place of death missing
Year of death missing
Bacharach Giants players
Hilldale Club players
Baseball catchers
Baseball players from Florida
Sportspeople from Daytona Beach, Florida